Dancing Mad (German: Der Tänzer meiner Frau) is a 1925 German silent comedy film directed by Alexander Korda and starring Victor Varconi, María Corda and Willy Fritsch. It based on the French play Le Danseur de Madame by Paul Armont and Jacques Bousquet. A free-spirited young wife flirts with an old flame, before finally settling down in her marriage.

Cast
Victor Varconi as Edmund Chauvelin 
María Corda as Lucille Chauvelin 
Willy Fritsch as Max de Sillery 
Livio Pavanelli as Claude Gerson 
Lea Seidl as Mad. Ivonne Trieux 
Hans Junkermann as prima dancer 
Hermann Thimig as Der Diener 
Olga Limburg as the maid
Marlene Dietrich as dancing extra 
Alexander Choura as dancing extra
John Loder as dancing extra

References

External links

1925 comedy films
German comedy films
Films of the Weimar Republic
German silent feature films
German films based on plays
Films directed by Alexander Korda
Films set in Paris
UFA GmbH films
German black-and-white films
Silent comedy films
1920s German films
1920s German-language films